Brian Richard Seage is the tenth and current bishop of the Episcopal Diocese of Mississippi. He was consecrated on September 27, 2014.

Biography
Brian R. Seage was elected on May 3, 2014, at St. Andrew's Cathedral in Jackson on the fifth ballot. He was consecrated on September 27, 2014, and succeeded Duncan M. Gray III, when Gray retired in February 2015.

Seage was elected as bishop coadjutor during his tenure as rector at St. Columb's in Ridgeland, Mississippi, where he served since 2005. He was also the dean of the Central Convocation of the Diocese of Mississippi where he helped co-ordinate and enable the ministry of Episcopal clergy in central Mississippi.

He holds an undergraduate degree from Pepperdine University and a master's of divinity from the Episcopal Theological Seminary of the Southwest. He has been a priest since 1998.

From 1997 to 1998, Seage served as curate at St. John's, Ocean Springs, and then as rector of St. Thomas Episcopal Church in Diamondhead from 1998 to 2005, growing both attendance and programming in the parish. A successful building program was completed and average Sunday attendance doubled during his ministry at St. Thomas.

Seage was called to St. Columb's in Ridgeland in 2005. St. Columb's attendance and programming grew under his leadership and a large building project was completed as well.

Before entering the priesthood, Seage served as director of youth ministry for St. Patrick's Episcopal Church in his native Thousand Oaks, California. In this large, program-size church he managed a team of volunteers to support both the junior high and senior high youth groups, assisted with chapel at St. Patrick's Day School, and coordinated the congregation's Habitat for Humanity program.

In the Diocese of Mississippi, Seage served as a Fresh Start facilitator and was on the diocese's executive committee from 2006 through 2009. He was also a member of the diocesan Restructure Task Force.

Seage was a camp director at Camp Bratton-Green every summer since 2006 and continued that ministry during his episcopacy. He also served on the Gray Center Board of Managers. While at St. Thomas, he served on the board of trustees for Coast Episcopal School.

Brian is married to Kyle Dice Seage, former rector at St. Philip's in Jackson, MS and current rector at St. Stephen's in Belvedere, California. They are parents to two adult daughters, Katie and Betsy.

Seage publicly announced his plans to resign his position on October 27, 2022. The search for the next bishop is predicted to take up to two years. Once the new bishop is in place, Seage will join his wife in California.

See also
 List of Episcopal bishops of the United States
 Historical list of the Episcopal bishops of the United States

References

External links 
Mississippi diocese elects Brian R. Seage as bishop coadjutor
 Seage announces resignation https://www.clarionledger.com/story/news/local/2022/10/27/episcopal-bishop-of-mississippi-brian-seage-leaving-for-california/69597647007/

Living people
Year of birth missing (living people)
Place of birth missing (living people)
Episcopal bishops of Mississippi